Mandevilla × amabilis is a species of flowering plant in the family Apocynaceae. It was described in 1974 in the journal Baileya. Also known as Alice du Pont.

Description
Evergreen climbing plant with opposite leaves of thick, rugose texture, with prominent venation. Flowers are pink with a yellow throat.

Range
The species has no natural range, having originated in cultivation in the mid-19th century. It is thought to be a hybrid between Mandevilla splendens and another, unknown species. Conversely, one source says that it is a natural hybrid occurring in Brazil.

Taxonomy
In a molecular analysis, M. × amabilis forms a sister clade to a complex that includes the natural species M. boliviensis and the Sundaville hybrids.

References

amabilis
Interspecific plant hybrids
]